Sam Vogel may refer to:

 Sam Vogel (born 1993), known as Jauz, American DJ and music producer
 Sam Vogel (boxer) (1902–?), American Olympian